On 8 May 2022, ten soldiers and one officer were killed during an attack at a checkpoint at a water pumping station in El Qantara, Sinai Peninsula, Egypt. Five more were injured.

The Islamic State claimed responsibility.

See also 

 Sinai insurgency

References

Terrorist incidents in Egypt in 2022
May 2022 crimes in Africa
2022 murders in Egypt
Sinai insurgency
Mass murder in 2022
Attacks in Egypt in 2022
Massacres of men